The 2011 A Championship was the fourth and final season of the A Championship in Ireland. The season was sponsored by Newstalk. The league featured 16 teams. Derry City A were the champions, while UCD A finished as runners up.

Pool 1

Teams

Final table

Results

Pool 2

Teams

Final table

Results

A Championship play-offs
The 2011 season saw the two pool winners plus the two pool runners-up qualify for the title play-off.

Semi-finals

Final

Top goalscorers

See also
 2011 League of Ireland Premier Division
 2011 League of Ireland First Division
 2011 League of Ireland Cup

References

 
3
A Championship seasons
Ireland
Ireland

fr:Championnat d'Irlande de football 2010#A Championship